Dorothy T. Krieger was an American academic and endocrine researcher who served as a professor and director of the Mount Sinai School of Medicine. Her major contribution was her discovery of treatment for Cushing's Disease.

Early life and career
Kreiger was born in Brooklyn, New York. At the age of 18, she graduated with a degree from the Barnard College. In 1949, she received a medical degree from Columbia University's College of Physicians and Surgeons.

In April 1984, she received a special award, Albert Lasker Special Public Health Award, by the Albert D. and Mary Lasker Foundation.

Personal life 
She was married to C. Wayne Bardin and has two children.

Awards
 Lasker Award (1984)

References

External links
 Dorothy T. Krieger - Worldcat

Icahn School of Medicine at Mount Sinai faculty
American endocrinologists